BGW may refer to:

Places 
BGW, the IATA airport code of Baghdad International Airport
GB-BGW, the ISO 3166-2 code for Blaenau Gwent, a Welsh county borough
Botanischer Garten der Universität Würzburg, a botanical garden in Bavaria, Germany
Botanischer Garten Wuppertal, a botanical garden in North Rhine-Westphalia, Germany
Busch Gardens Williamsburg, a theme park in Virginia, USA

Organizations 
BGW Systems, an audio amplifier manufacturer
, the German federal gas and water industry group
Bahngesellschaft Waldhof AG, a rail company in Mannheim, Germany

Other uses 
BGW (Blue Gene Watson), a protein folding simulation performed on the Blue Gene supercomputer
Bala Ganapathi William (born 1990), Malaysian actor and director known professionally as BGW